Greatest Hits is the second compilation album of songs by American jazz pianist/composer Vince Guaraldi released in 1980 in the U.S., Canada and Europe.

Background
Released four years after Guaraldi's untimely death from a heart attack, Greatest Hits was Fantasy Records' attempt to gather the pianist's best known songs, picking up from where the 1964 compilation album Jazz Impressions left off. As the album was issued by Fantasy, it excluded tracks from Guaraldi's three Warner Bros.-Seven Arts releases (Oh Good Grief!, The Eclectic Vince Guaraldi, Alma-Ville) as well as Vince Guaraldi with the San Francisco Boys Chorus (1967) released on Guaraldi's own D&D record label.

Greatest Hits was repackaged and expanded for CD release on July 11, 1989, with a different cover and one additional track culled from the album From All Sides (1965).

Track listing

Original 1980 vinyl/cassette issue
For the vinyl/cassette release, 45 single edit versions of "Days of Wine and Roses", "Samba de Orpheus" and "Zelao" were utilized, while the shorter version of "Christmas Time Is Here" with vocals was included.

1989 CD release
For the CD release, "Days of Wine and Roses", "Samba de Orpheus" and "Zelao" were restored to their original album lengths, while the longer, instrumental version of "Christmas Time Is Here" was featured. "Ginza Samba" was also added as a bonus track.

† = bonus track

Personnel
Credits adapted from 1989 CD liner notes.

 Vince Guaraldi – piano
 Bola Sete – guitar 
 Eddie Duran – guitar 
 Monty Budwig – double bass 
 Fred Marshall – double bass 
 Colin Bailey – drums 
 Nick Martinez – drums 
 Jerry Granelli – drums 
 Lee Charlton – drums 
 Bill Fitch – congas 
 Benny Velarde – timbales ; güiro 

Additional
 Gene Santoro – liner notes

References

External links
 

1980 compilation albums
Fantasy Records compilation albums
Albums produced by Vince Guaraldi
Vince Guaraldi albums
Vince Guaraldi compilation albums
Albums arranged by Vince Guaraldi
Cool jazz compilation albums
Mainstream jazz compilation albums